Wojo is a common nickname for many people with long Polish or other eastern European surnames beginning "Woj-". 

Wojo or WOJO could refer to:

People
 David Wojcinski (born 1980), former Australian rules footballer
 Bob Wojnowski (born 1961), Detroit News sports writer, co-host of Stoney and Wojo with Mike Stone
 Steve Wojciechowski (born 1976), American college basketball head coach and former player
 Aleksander Wojtkiewicz (1963–2006), Polish chess player
 The Great Wojo, professional wrestler Greg Wojciechowski (born 1951)

Other uses
 Detective Stan Wojciehowicz, a character from the television sitcom Barney Miller
 WOJO, a radio station (105.1 FM) licensed to Evanston, Illinois, United States
 Wojo, a dialect of the West Banda language, spoken in the Central African Republic and South Sudan
 Wojo railway station, a stop on the Prambanan Express in Indonesia

Hypocorisms